Opoptera is a genus of South American butterflies formerly considered to be part of the genus Opsiphanes.

Species
Species group aorsa
Opoptera aorsa (Godart, [1824])
Opoptera arsippe (Hopffer, 1874)
Opoptera bracteolata Stichel, 1901
Opoptera hilaris Stichel, 1901
Opoptera staudingeri (Godman & Salvin, 1894)
Species group syme
Opoptera fruhstorferi (Röber, 1896)
Opoptera sulcius (Staudinger, 1887)
Opoptera syme (Hübner, [1821])

References

Morphinae
Nymphalidae of South America
Nymphalidae genera
Taxa named by Per Olof Christopher Aurivillius